Fast & Furious Crossroads was a racing and action role-playing video game based on the Fast & Furious film franchise. It was developed by Slightly Mad Studios, a subsidiary studio of the British developer Codemasters, and published by Bandai Namco Entertainment. The game was scheduled to release on Microsoft Windows, PlayStation 4 and Xbox One in May 2020, but was delayed to August 7 as a result of the COVID-19 pandemic following the postponement of F9. Upon release, the game received mostly negative reviews.

Gameplay 
Fast & Furious Crossroads was set across global locations and features main characters from the Fast & Furious film franchise. The game offers a new storyline and action, with loads of cars. In addition to the single-player mode, which focused on the story, a multiplayer mode was also available in the game.

While the majority of Fast & Furious Crossroads was focused on racing, players must also fight enemies and avoid traps by using equipped weapons on their cars.

Plot

Cast 

 Vin Diesel as Dominic Toretto, a former criminal and professional street racer who has retired and settled down with his wife, Letty, and his son, Brian Marcos.
 Michelle Rodriguez as Letty Ortiz, Dom's wife, and a former criminal and professional street racer.
 Tyrese Gibson as Roman Pearce, an ex-habitual offender, expert street racer and a member of Dom's team.
 Sonequa Martin-Green as Vienna Cole.
 Asia Kate Dillon as Cameron "Cam" Stone.
 Imari Williams as Lamar, Roman's friend.
 Christian Lanz as Sebastian, Vienna's friend from Spain.
 Andres Aguilar as Mauricio, a Spanish street racer.
 Peter Stormare as Ormstrid, the man whose own his enterprise, OCM.
 Tamika Simpkins as Salome.
 Usman Ally as Kai.

Development 
The game was announced during The Game Awards 2019 and was set to be launched in May 2020 for Microsoft Windows, PlayStation 4 and Xbox One following the release of F9 to theaters. However, the COVID-19 pandemic forced both works to postpone. On May 27, 2020, it was announced that the game would be released on August 7, 2020.

Bandai Namco announced that the game would be delisted from all platforms by end-April 2022, with all sales ending on 29 April at 4am CEST.

Reception 

Fast & Furious Crossroads received "generally unfavorable" reviews on all platforms according to review aggregator Metacritic.

IGN gave the game a 4 out of 10, stating that it is "short, shallow, and surprisingly simple, and it's nothing less than a crashing disappointment in virtually every department".

References

External links 
 

2020 video games
Bandai Namco games
Codemasters games
Slightly Mad Studios games
Video games set in Greece
Video games set in New Orleans
Video games set in Morocco
Video games set in Spain
Fast & Furious video games
Delisted digital-only games
Windows games
PlayStation 4 games
PlayStation 4 Pro enhanced games
Xbox One games
Xbox One X enhanced games
Racing video games
Action role-playing video games
Multiplayer and single-player video games
Products and services discontinued in 2022
Video games postponed due to the COVID-19 pandemic
Video games developed in the United Kingdom